Thomas Alfred Royds Littledale (2 April 1850 – 4 December 1938) was a British sailor who competed in the 1908 Summer Olympics.

He was a crew member of the British boat Mouchette, which won the silver medal in the 12 metre class.

References

External links 
 
 

1850 births
1938 deaths
British male sailors (sport)
Olympic sailors of Great Britain
Olympic silver medallists for Great Britain
Olympic medalists in sailing
Sailors at the 1908 Summer Olympics – 12 Metre
Medalists at the 1908 Summer Olympics